

Events

Publications 
 Nikolay Chernyshevsky, The Anthropological Principle in Philosophy

Births 
 John Stuart Mackenzie (died 1935)
 January 6 - George Stout (died 1944)

Deaths 
 March 23 - Joseph Franz Molitor (born 1779)
 September 21 - Arthur Schopenhauer (born 1788)
 October 5 - Aleksey Khomyakov (born 1804)
 December 27 - Dominik Szulc (born 1787)

Philosophy
19th-century philosophy
Philosophy by year